The 1968 Texas Tech Red Raiders football team represented Texas Technological College—now known as Texas Tech University—as a member of the Southwest Conference (SWC) during the 1968 NCAA University Division football season. In their eighth season under head coach J. T. King, the Red Raiders compiled a 5–3–2 record (4–3 against conference opponents), finished in fourth place in the SWC, and outscored opponents by a combined total of 255 to 241. The team's statistical leaders included Joe Matulich with 864 passing yards, Roger Freeman with 471 rushing yards, and Bobby Allen with 546 receiving yards. The team played its home games at Clifford B. & Audrey Jones Stadium.

Schedule

References

Texas Tech
Texas Tech Red Raiders football seasons
Texas Tech Red Raiders football